This is a list of King of the Cage (KOTC) champions at each weight class. KOTC is a USA-based mixed martial arts (MMA) organization that was founded in 1998.

The weight division system of KOTC is divided up in accordance with the Unified Rules of Mixed Martial Arts, but with some variations.
KOTC has chosen to name its 145-pound division "Bantamweight" (instead of Featherweight), its 135-pound division "Flyweight" (instead of Bantamweight) and its 125-pound division "Light Flyweight" (instead of Flyweight). KOTC also takes advantage of the rarely used Super Heavyweight division for fighters exceeding the 265-pound weight limit of the Heavyweight division.

In addition to these variances, KOTC also employs three exclusive weight classes that were not specified within the Unified Rules of Mixed Martial Arts (until July 2017): a 165-pound "Light Welterweight" division, a 230-pound "Cruiserweight" division, and a 195-pound "Super Middleweight"''' division. These divisions were later introduced (amongst others) into the Unified Rules of MMA, with "Light Welterweight" being called "Super Lightweight".

Current champions

Title history

Super Heavyweight ChampionshipOver Prior to 2002 this weight class was referred to as Heavyweight.Heavyweight Championship to In 2002 the Heavyweight and its title history were reclassified as Super Heavyweight and a new Heavyweight title was created with its current weight limit.Cruiserweight Championship to Light Heavyweight Championship to Super Middleweight Championship to Middleweight Championship to Welterweight Championship to Light Welterweight Championship to Lightweight Championship to This weightclass was originally referred to as Middleweight and had an upper weight limit of Bantamweight Championship to Prior to 2004 this weight class was referred to as Flyweight.Flyweight Championship to Light Flyweight Championship to Women's Bantamweight Championship to Women's Flyweight Championship to Women's Strawweight Championship to Women's Atomweight ChampionshipUntil ''

Light Heavyweight Superfight

CANADIAN Middleweight Championship

CANADIAN Welterweight Championship

CANADIAN Bantamweight Championship

Retired Titles

Openweight Championship

Openweight Superfight

Heavyweight Superfight

Middleweight Superfight

Most consecutive title defenses
The following includes all KOTC champions who were able to consecutively defend their title three times or more. Fighters with the same number of title defenses are listed chronologically.

Most wins in title bouts
Fighters with four or more championship and/or interim championship title wins. Fighters with the same number of title wins are arranged in order of most title fights. Openweight and Superfight champions are not included.

References

External links
King of the Cage fighter rankings

Mixed martial arts champions
Kotc Champions, List Of